Keith Arnold may refer to:
Keith Arnold (bishop) (1926–2021), first bishop of Warwick (1980–1990)
Keith Arnold (cricketer) (born 1960), former English cricketer
J. Keith Arnold (born 1959), Florida politician
Keith Arnold, candidate in the United States House of Representatives elections in Washington, 2010